James Livingstone Duthie (born 27 October 1957) is a former field hockey player, who won the bronze medal with the British squad at the 1984 Summer Olympics in Los Angeles. He played club hockey for Southgate. He would have gone to the 1988 Olympics but he broke his leg prior to the games during a match. He was the coach of the men's GB team at the 1996 Atlanta Olympics

External links
 
 

1957 births
Living people
Field hockey players from Glasgow
People educated at Bishop's Stortford College
Scottish male field hockey players
British male field hockey players
Olympic field hockey players of Great Britain
Field hockey players at the 1984 Summer Olympics
Olympic bronze medallists for Great Britain
Olympic medalists in field hockey
Medalists at the 1984 Summer Olympics
Scottish Olympic medallists
Southgate Hockey Club players
Scottish field hockey coaches